Betty Anyanwu-Akeredolu (born 20 July 1953) is an aquaculturist, philanthropist, and the First lady of Ondo State in Nigeria. She is a feminist and gender activist. She is married to governor Oluwarotimi Odunayo Akeredolu. She is the founder of the Breast Cancer Association of Nigeria. She is a survivor of breast cancer, after suffering from the cancer when she was beginning to actualize her manifest destiny in life.

Birth
Betty Anyanwu-Akeredolu was born on 20 July 1953, to the family of chief BUB and Nneoma Dora Anyanwu, in Emeabiam, Owerri-West, in Imo State.

Education
Anyanwu-Akeredolu attended the University of Nigeria, Nsukka where she obtained a Bachelor of Science degree in zoology in 1977. She holds a Master of science degree in fisheries, major in aquaculture, from the University of the Philippines Visayas in Iloilo City.

Career
She began her career as a fish farmer while working with the Federal Department of Fisheries. She retired in 2005. She is a commercial fish farmer and provides consultancy services through her firm, Aquatek Farms Ventures. In addition, she has made a foray into politics since 2007 and is active in the present (2017) dispensation.

Charity and philanthropy
In 1997, she was diagnosed with breast cancer. She underwent treatment and survived. She started the nonprofit organization, Breast Cancer Association of Nigeria (BRECAN) to raise awareness of the disease. She has won awards in recognition of her work and commitment in the fight against breast cancer in Nigeria.

She is also a supporter of the Bring Back Our Girls movement.

She was passionate about the widow that made her launch a platform for them to gain from the dividends of democracy.

Personal life
She is married to Oluwarotimi Odunayo Akeredolu, SAN. They have four children and four grandchildren.

See also 

 List of first ladies of Nigerian states

References

1953 births
Living people
First Ladies of Nigeria
People from Ondo State
Pisciculturists
University of Nigeria alumni
University of the Philippines Visayas alumni